Adrienne Jouclard (4 September 1882 – 14 December 1972) was a French painter. Her work was part of the art competitions at the 1932 Summer Olympics and the 1948 Summer Olympics.

References

1882 births
1972 deaths
20th-century French painters
French women painters
Olympic competitors in art competitions
People from Meurthe-et-Moselle
20th-century French women